Konvitz is a surname. Notable people with the surname include:

Jeffrey Konvitz (born 1944), American attorney, writer, and film producer
Milton R. Konvitz (1908–2003), American law professor